Jobi can refer to:

Given name
 Jobi McAnuff, British footballer
 Hiob Ludolf, German scholar also known as Jobi
 Uschi Digard, actress also known as Jobi

Animals
 Jobi manucode, a bird
 Jobi tree frog

See also
 Yapen or Japen, an island of Papua, Indonesia
 Joby, a given name